The IZh-56 «Belka» (ИЖ-56 «Белка») is a Soviet double-barreled combination gun.

History 
IZh-56 was designed in 1956 and it was based on IZhK model.

Since 1961, a new varnish with improved characteristics has been used to protect the wooden parts of the gun.

In December 1964, the price of one standard IZh-56-3 was 45 roubles.

Design 
IZh-56 is an over and under shotgun, with one barrel above the other.

It has a birch or beech stock and fore-end.

All IZh-56s have iron sights and they can be equipped with scope base for PVS-1 (ПВС-1) optical sight. The weight of PVS-1 scope without the scope base is 150 grams.

IZh-56-3 can be equipped with PO-2 (ПО-2) optical sight.

Variants 
 IZh-56-1 «Belka» (ИЖ-56-1 «Белка») - first model, since 1956 until 1958 31 903 guns were made.
 IZh-56-2 «Belka» (ИЖ-56-2 «Белка») - second model
 IZh-56-3 «Belka» (ИЖ-56-3 «Белка») - third model, since 1958 until 1964 77 043 guns were made

Users 

 
  - the import was allowed

References

Sources 
 Двуствольное пуледробовое ружьё "Белка". Памятка по устройству и обращению. Ижевск, 1956.
 Охотничье двуствольное пуле-дробовое ружьё "Белка" // Охотничье, спортивное огнестрельное оружие. Каталог. М., 1958. стр.38-39
 инженер А. Климов. Третья модель "Белки" // журнал «Охота и охотничье хозяйство», № 9, сентябрь 1958. стр.36-37
 Двуствольное охотничье ружьё ИЖ-56-3 "Белка" // Спортивно-охотничье оружие и патроны. Бухарест, "Внешторгиздат", 1965. стр.52-53
 Л. Е. Михайлов, Н. Л. Изметинский. Ижевские охотничьи ружья. 2-е изд., испр. и доп. Ижевск, изд-во «Удмуртия», 1982. стр.187-193
 А. Соколов. Старые модели. ИЖ-56 - "Белка" // журнал "Охота и охотничье хозяйство", № 6, 1991. стр.29 - ISSN 0131-2596
 Ижевское оружие. Том 1. Ижевские ружья / Н. Л. Изметинский, Л. Е. Михайлов. - Ижевск, издательство Удмуртского университета, 1995. - 247 стр. : ил.
 Алексей Булатов. ИЖ-56 "Белка" // журнал "Оружие и охота", № 5, 2002

External links 
 Izhmekh IZh-56 / Internet Movie Firearms Database

Double-barreled shotguns of the Soviet Union
Combination guns
Izhevsk Mechanical Plant products
.22 LR firearms
Weapons and ammunition introduced in 1956